Junkie: Confessions of an Unredeemed Drug Addict (originally titled Junk, later released as Junky) is a novel by American beat generation writer William S. Burroughs, initially published under the pseudonym William Lee in 1953. His first published work, it is semi-autobiographical and focuses on Burroughs' life as a drug user and dealer. It has come to be considered a seminal text on the lifestyle of heroin addicts in the early 1950s.

Inspiration
The novel was considered unpublishable more than it was controversial. Burroughs began it largely at the request and insistence of Allen Ginsberg, who was impressed by Burroughs's letter-writing skill. Burroughs took up the task with little enthusiasm. However, partly because he saw that becoming a publishable writer was possible (his friend Jack Kerouac had published his first novel The Town and the City in 1950), he began to compile his experiences as an addict, 'lush roller' who stole from inebriated homeless persons, and small-time Greenwich Village heroin pusher.

Although it was long considered Burroughs' first novel, he had in fact several years earlier completed a manuscript called And the Hippos Were Boiled in Their Tanks with Kerouac, but this work would remain unpublished in its entirety until 2008.

Ginsberg as editor and literary agent
Burroughs's work would not have been published but for Allen Ginsberg's determination. Besides encouraging Burroughs to write, he worked as editor and agent as the manuscript was written in Mexico City. Queer, the companion piece to Junkie, was written at the same time and parts of it were designed to be included in Junkie, since the first manuscript was dismissed as poorly written and lacking in interest and insight. After many rejection letters, Burroughs stopped writing.

Ginsberg found Burroughs a publisher through Carl Solomon, whom he had met at the psychiatric hospital to which Ginsberg was sent in 1949 by a judge following the latter's trial for receiving stolen goods. Solomon was the nephew of A. A. Wyn, who owned Ace Books. Having secured the publisher's interest, Ginsberg forced Burroughs to revisit the text. Ginsberg soothed Burroughs's indignation at the necessary edits, and was able to finally place the novel with the New York publishing house.

Publishing history and editions

Ace Books primarily catered to New York City subway riders, and competed in the same market as comic book, true crime, and detective fiction publishers. Ace published no hardcover books, only cheap paperbacks, which sold for very little; Burroughs earned less than a cent royalty on each purchase.

Most libraries at the time did not buy Ace books, considering them trivial and without literary merit, and Ace paperbacks were never reviewed by literary critics. At the time of its publication, the novel was in a two-book ("dos-à-dos") omnibus edition (known as an "Ace Double") alongside a previously published 1941 novel called Narcotic Agent by Maurice Helbrant. Burroughs chose to use the pseudonym "William Lee", Lee being his mother's maiden name, for the writing credit. The subtitle of the work was Confessions of an Unredeemed Drug Addict. This edition is a highly desired collectible and even below-average-condition copies have been known to cost hundreds of dollars. The United States Library of Congress purchased a copy in 1992 for its Rare Book/Special Collections Reading Room.

Numerous reprints of the book appeared in the 1960s and 1970s once Burroughs achieved notoriety with Naked Lunch, with the work now credited under his real name. Generally, American editions used the original Junkie spelling for the title, while UK editions usually changed this to Junky.

In 1977 a complete edition of the original text was published by Penguin Books with an introduction by Allen Ginsberg; sections of the manuscript referring to Burroughs's homosexuality, which had been edited out of earlier editions, were included for the first time. In 2003, to mark the work's 50th anniversary, Penguin reissued the book as Junky: The Definitive Text of "Junk." It included a new introduction by Oliver Harris, the British literary scholar, who integrated new material never before published; Harris had found edits of deleted material in the literary archives of Allen Ginsberg.

The text

The text is memorable for its content and style. The distant, dry, laconic tone of the narrator is balanced by the openness and honesty of the story. Burroughs offers details about his narrator's behavior. He speaks from the vantage point of an eyewitness, reporting back to ‘straights’ the feelings, thoughts, actions and characters he meets in the criminal fringe of New York, at the Lexington Federal Narcotics Hospital/Prison in Kentucky, and in New Orleans and Mexico City.

The story takes on a more personal tone when the narrator leaves New York. In subsequent sections the substantive facts are replaced by a more intimate, desperate search for meaning and escape from criminal sanction and permanent addiction. Throughout, there are flashes of Burroughs's acutely graphic description, and agonizingly candid confessions: traits that would mark his literature for the next forty years.

Peruvian novelist Mario Vargas Llosa wrote that while he did not care for Burroughs's subsequent experimental fiction, he admired the more straightforward Junky both on its own merits and further as "an accurate description of what I believe to be the literary vocation"; i.e., the all-consuming nature of writing as similar to addiction.

Recorded performances
At least three recordings have been issued featuring readings from this book. Some time in the late 1960s or early 1970s, Burroughs recorded an extensive passage from the book which was issued on a record album. Later, in the 1990s, two audiobook editions were released, one read by actor David Carradine, and another read by Burroughs himself.

Editions
Junkie: Confessions of an Unredeemed Drug Addict. An Ace Original. William Lee. New York, NY: Ace Books, 1953. (No assigned ISBN. LC Control Number: 92183851)
Junky: Originally Published as Junkie Under the Pen Name of William Lee. William S. Burroughs with an introduction by Allen Ginsberg. 1st complete and unexpurgated edition. New York, NY, U.S.A.: Penguin Books, 1977. 
Junky: the definitive text of 'Junk'. William S. Burroughs; edited and with an introduction by Oliver Harris. New York: Penguin Books, 2003.

References

1953 American novels
1953 debut novels
1950s LGBT novels
Ace Books books
American autobiographical novels
Beat novels
Metafictional novels
Novels about drugs
Novels by William S. Burroughs
Novels set in New York City
Opioids in the United States
Works published under a pseudonym